Våganavisa (The Vågan Gazette) is a local Norwegian newspaper published in Svolvær in Nordland county. 

The paper was launched on November 1, 2006 and it appears once a week. It is owned and edited by Mari Rokkan. Edd Meby served as the editor until 2016. In 2009, Våganavisa was named Local Newspaper of the Year by the National Association of Local Newspapers.

Circulation
According to the Norwegian Audit Bureau of Circulations and National Association of Local Newspapers, Våganavisa has had the following annual circulation:
2007: 1,743
2008: 2,067
2009: 2,040
2010: 2,295
2011: 2,359
2012: 2,543
2013: 2,563
2014: 2,477
2015: 2,460
2016: 2,326

References

External links
Våganavisa homepage

Newspapers published in Norway
Norwegian-language newspapers
Vågan
Mass media in Nordland
Publications established in 2006
2006 establishments in Norway